The Gibeau Orange Julep restaurant (also known colloquially as OJ or The Big Orange or The Julep) is a roadside attraction and fast food restaurant in Montreal, Quebec, Canada.

History
The Restaurant was started by Hermas Gibeau in 1932 to serve his trademark drink the Gibeau Orange Julep, reportedly based on a Gibeau family recipe. Before founding the first location, Gibeau sold his drinks at Belmont Park, a popular amusement park at the time. The original storefront he opened, located on rue Sherbrooke Est, was not shaped like an orange. The cult following that developed revolved around his second location, the Big Orange, located on Decarie Blvd.

For a brief time, the Julep was noted for rollerskating waitresses, who brought food orders to cars. Customers today order and receive their food at the counter. Food can then be taken away or eaten at one of the picnic tables. The restaurant opens at 8 am and operates until 3 am on Fridays and Saturdays, and until 2 am the rest of the week.

An August 9, 2019 article by the Montreal Gazette cited an earlier (August 9, 1977) article on the restaurant “At Gibeau’s Julep, the 1950s never really left. It’s a scene that has outlasted LSD, the Vietnam war and thus far pollution,” Juan Rodriguez reported, in an Aug. 9, 1977 feature on the Décarie Blvd. landmark.” Rodriguez, the original author, emphasized the importance of the restaurant as a social hub, separate from its food or drink.

Structure 
In 1945, Gibeau built an orange concrete sphere two stories high to house his restaurant. It is believed Gibeau intended to live there with his wife and children. The Big Orange, the last standing operating Orange Julep, was once one of several Gibeau Orange Julep restaurants in the Montreal area and beyond, many shaped like a giant orange.

A 1969 Montreal Gazette article by Peter Lanken reported “The original Orange Julep was conceived, in 1945… It was on Decarie Boulevard, it was round, it was concrete, and it was orange. It had a small square window on the second floor, which made it look like something out of a children’s book...” Though Lanken refers to The Big Orange as the original restaurant, it was in fact the second location, though the first orange-shaped one. The restaurant and its orange sphere were rebuilt, from a design by architect Olius P. Bois, to be larger and further back from the roadway when it was widened to become the Décarie Expressway in 1966. Its shell consists of fiberglass segments that were ordered from a local pool manufacturer, covering a laminated wood shell frame. The whole building is illuminated from the outside in the evenings.

This style of building is called mimetic architecture, where a building is shaped in such a way that it references the purpose of the building.

Drink and other products

The drink, the Gibeau Orange Julep, was first marketed in 1932. In addition to the storefront, The Orange Julep juice is also retailed, and there are recipes available online. Propos Montreal claims to have found the patent for the recipe. However, it was patented by the current owner in 1993. As outlined in the patent, No. 2083584, filed in English by Gibeau, the recipe explains that the fruit juice is deacidified by the mixture of skimmed milk powder and pectin before adding the juice concentrate and the natural vanilla flavor.

There are also vegetarian options: the veggie burger, veggie hot dogs, and veggie pogos.

Events
For decades up until 2019, the Orange Julep hosted classic car "cruise nights" on Wednesday evenings from 5:30 pm to about 9:30 pm (May to September). If the weather permitted, an announcer would walk around talking about the classic cars in the main parking lot that day while chatting with the classic car owners. The main parking lot was designated for classic cars and classic motorcycles only (pre-1980 models) often filling up beyond capacity. People arriving in modern vehicles could park in the secondary back lot. The 1950s & 60s rock 'n' roll music would play on the loudspeakers. Occasionally a DJ would be set up outside to take requests. Each classic car had an Orange Julep number assigned to it, and at the end of the evening, prizes were awarded to the winning car owners for the different categories.  On some days, people who ordered food could vote for their favorite classic car by writing the car number on the back of their food receipt and slipping it into a box. T-shirts and other memorabilia were often tossed into the crowd too. Photography enthusiasts were often spotted there with vintage film cameras as well with some people dressing up in 1950s fashion for the occasion (photos could be posted to the Orange Julep Cruise Nights Facebook page). Families would often bring their dogs too. The many fans of the event are very disappointed it is no longer being held.  Often similar events were held on Tuesdays and Thursdays specifically for motorcycles and Chevrolet Corvettes.

In the media 

The restaurant appears, along with other Montreal landmarks, in the music video for the Men Without Hats song "Where Do the Boys Go?". The Orange Julep has a presence on some social media platforms, such as Twitter and Facebook. The restaurant's Twitter is not as active as their location tags on Instagram but has been used in the past to do updates on the restaurant as well as engaging with other popular Montreal Twitter accounts, such as MTL Blog. The Facebook page has been more active in the past, sharing photos and reviews of the restaurant.

The Orange Julep is one of the original landmarks in Montreal, making it one of the many sought at tourist locations on the island. The restaurant has been mentioned on Tripadvisor, Trip Savvy, Daily Hive, Propos Montreal, MTL Blog, and the Montreal Gazette.

References

Côte-des-Neiges–Notre-Dame-de-Grâce
Domes
Hot dog restaurants
Landmarks in Montreal
Novelty buildings in Canada
Oranges (fruit)
Rebuilt buildings and structures in Canada
Relocated buildings and structures in Canada
Restaurants established in 1932
Restaurants in Montreal
Roadside attractions in Canada
1932 establishments in Quebec